The Calcutta Women's Football League, also known as the Kanyashree Cup, is a women's football league in the Indian state of West Bengal. Founded in 1993, it is the oldest women's football league in India and organised by Indian Football Association (IFA), the official football governing body in the state. The tournament is participated by teams across West Bengal, primarily Kolkata.

History
The Calcutta Women's Football League was founded by Indian Football Association (IFA) in 1993 to introduce women's football in West Bengal in the lines of men's domestic football system. The inaugural edition was won by an institutional team of Income Tax Department against Behala Aikya Sammilani. Due to lack of sufficient resources and reception towards women's football in the nation, the organising body either cancelled or organised the tournament in small scale for the following years, thereby leaving negligible data about the tournament during the period. 

The popularity considerably rose when the two big clubs of Bengal—East Bengal and Mohun Bagan—formed their respective women's teams to participate in the competition. Both the teams would reach the finals for two consecutive years, with East Bengal winning in 2001 and Mohun Bagan in 2002. But, considering no national level honours to fight for, the two clubs found it financially unprofitable to maintain a women's football division, thus East Bengal disbanded it in 2003 and Mohun Bagan in 2004. During this period, the only team to continue their dominance was Income Tax. After years of discontinuation of the competition, it was started once again in 2017. The following year was won by another institutional team – Sashastra Seema Bal (SSB). This was the first edition of Calcutta Women's Football League where the winner was given a chance to qualify for Indian Women's League. 

In 2020 the tournament was renamed to Kanyashree Cup under the patronage of the state Chief Minister Mamata Banerjee. East Bengal once again formed its women's team to participate and reached the finals where they lost against SSB, who became the second team after Income Tax to win three consecutive finals. The 2021 edition did not take place due to COVID-19 pandemic and in the following edition, due to management disputes, East Bengal informed IFA about not participating. SSB continued their dominance by defeating the women's team of Southern Samity.

Champions

See also
Women's football in India
Football in India

References

Women's football leagues in India
Football in West Bengal
Sports leagues established in 1993
1993 establishments in West Bengal